Nurul Islam MBE (25 November 1928 – 7 October 2006) was a British-Bangladeshi broadcast journalist, news presenter, and radio producer and presenter. He had more than 50 years of experience in radio and television and is best known for his work with the BBC World Service.

Career
Islam was born in Dacca, Bengal Presidency, British Raj (now Bangladesh). Initially trained as a photographer and an actor. Worked for the Department of Films and Publication after partition in 1947 and became the first Bengali newsreader to announce the birth of the new Pakistan.

In 1949, Islam travelled to London and studied economics and politics at the London School of Economics, and commenced freelance work as a Bengali contributor, actor and broadcaster for BBC Radio. He returned to Pakistan and worked in both radio and television, helping to make government newsreels at key moments in history.

After announcing on radio the independent state of Bangladesh in 1971, Islam returned to the BBC in England. He joined the Voice of America in Washington in the late 1970s for two years, after which he returned to BBC World Service based in Bush House in London and presented Bengali language children's program, Kakoli.

In 1988, following his official retirement Islam continued as a freelance broadcaster and a mentor to his colleagues at the Bengali section of the World Service at the BBC.

Death
Nurul Islam died in Surrey, England after a period of illness.

See also
 British Bangladeshi
 List of British Bangladeshis

References

1928 births
2006 deaths
British Muslims
Bangladeshi emigrants to England
British people of Bangladeshi descent
Naturalised citizens of the United Kingdom
Bangladeshi male voice actors
British male radio actors
20th-century Bangladeshi male actors
20th-century British male actors
BBC newsreaders and journalists
Bangladeshi television presenters
Bangladeshi radio personalities
People from Dhaka
Alumni of the London School of Economics